Loren Grey (1915–2007; born Middletown, New York) was an American novelist and educational psychologist who attended the USC Rossier School of Education.  He was the son of the writer Zane Grey.

Lassiter novels
 Lassiter (1985)
 Ambush for Lassiter (1985)
 Lassiter Gold (1986)
 Lassiter Tough (1986)
 The Lassiter Luck (1986)
 A Grave for Lassiter (1987)
 Lassiter's Ride (1988)
 Lassiter on the Texas Trail (1988)
 Lassiter and the Great Horse Race (1989)
 Lassiter and the Golden Dragon (1989)
 Lassiter's Showdown (1990)
 Lassiter in the Comanche Stronghold (1990)

References

McLellan, Dennis, Loren Grey, 91; son of writer Zane Grey was educational psychologist. Los Angeles Times. Archived from the original on 29 June 2011.

1915 births
2007 deaths
USC Rossier School of Education alumni
Educational psychologists
People from Middletown, Orange County, New York
Writers from New York (state)